Flinch may refer to:

Flinching
Flinch (game show), a Netflix original programme
Flinch (comics), a Vertigo Comics horror anthology
Flinch (film), a 2021 crime thriller film by Cameron Van Hoy
Flinch (novel), a 2001 novel by Robert Ferrigno
"Flinch" (song), a 2002 song by Alanis Morissette on her album Under Rug Swept
Flinch (band), a Finnish glam rock band